

Peerage of England

|rowspan="3"|Duke of Cornwall (1337)||Arthur Tudor||1486||1502||Died, and his peerage dignities lapsed to the Crown
|-
|Henry Tudor||1502||1509||Ascended the Throne, when all his honours merged in the Crown
|-
|none||1509||1511||
|-
|Duke of Buckingham (1444)||Edward Stafford, 3rd Duke of Buckingham||1485||1521||
|-
|Duke of Norfolk (1483)||none||1485||1514||Attainted
|-
|Duke of York (1494)||Henry Tudor||1494||1504||Creation became void, by Act of Parliament; Duke of Cornwall since 1502, see above
|-
|rowspan="2"|Marquess of Dorset (1475)||Thomas Grey, 1st Marquess of Dorset||1475||1501||Died
|-
|Thomas Grey, 2nd Marquess of Dorset||1501||1530||
|-
|Earl of Arundel (1138)||Thomas FitzAlan, 17th Earl of Arundel||1487||1524||
|-
|Earl of Oxford (1142)||John de Vere, 13th Earl of Oxford||1485||1513||
|-
|Earl of Westmorland (1397)||Ralph Neville, 4th Earl of Westmorland||1499||1549||
|-
|Earl of Northumberland (1416)||Henry Percy, 5th Earl of Northumberland||1489||1527||
|-
|Earl of Shrewsbury (1442)||George Talbot, 4th Earl of Shrewsbury||1473||1538||
|-
|Earl of Essex (1461)||Henry Bourchier, 2nd Earl of Essex||1483||1540||
|-
|rowspan="2"|Earl of Kent (1465)||George Grey, 2nd Earl of Kent||1490||1505||Died
|-
|Richard Grey, 3rd Earl of Kent||1505||1524||
|-
|Earl of Surrey (1483)||Thomas Howard, 1st Earl of Surrey||1483||1491||
|-
|Earl of Devon (1485)||Edward Courtenay, 1st Earl of Devon||1485||1509||Died, peerage forfeited as his son and heir was attainted
|-
|rowspan="2"|Earl of Derby (1485)||Thomas Stanley, 1st Earl of Derby||1485||1504||Died
|-
|Thomas Stanley, 2nd Earl of Derby||1504||1521||
|-
|Viscount Beaumont (1440)||William Beaumont, 2nd Viscount Beaumont||1460||1507||Died, title extinct
|-
|Viscount Lisle (1483)||John Grey, 2nd Viscount Lisle||1492||1504||Died, title extinct
|-
|Baron de Ros (1264)||Edmund de Ros, 10th Baron de Ros||1464||1508||Died, Barony fell into abeyance
|-
|Baron Dynham (1295)||John Dynham, 8th or 1st Baron Dynham||1467||1501||Died, Barony fell into abeyance
|-
|Baron FitzWalter (1295)||Robert Radcliffe, 10th Baron FitzWalter||1506||1542||Attainter reversed
|-
|Baron FitzWarine (1295)||John Bourchier, 11th Baron FitzWarin||1479||1539||
|-
|Baron Grey de Wilton (1295)||Edmund Grey, 9th Baron Grey de Wilton||1498||1511||
|-
|Baron Clinton (1299)||John Clinton, 7th Baron Clinton||1488||1514||
|-
|Baron De La Warr (1299)||Thomas West, 8th Baron De La Warr||1476||1525||
|-
|rowspan="2"|Baron Ferrers of Chartley (1299)||John Devereux, 9th Baron Ferrers of Chartley||1468||1501||Died
|-
|Walter Devereux, 10th Baron Ferrers of Chartley||1501||1558||
|-
|Baron de Clifford (1299)||Henry Clifford, 10th Baron de Clifford||1485||1523||
|-
|Baron Morley (1299)||Alice Parker, 9th Baroness Morley||1489||1518||
|-
|Baron Strange of Knockyn (1299)||Joan le Strange, 9th Baroness Strange||1470||1514||
|-
|Baron Zouche of Haryngworth (1308)||John la Zouche, 7th Baron Zouche||1468||1526||
|-
|Baron Cobham of Kent (1313)||John Brooke, 7th Baron Cobham||1464||1512||
|-
|Baron Willoughby de Eresby (1313)||William Willoughby, 11th Baron Willoughby de Eresby||1499||1526||
|-
|Baron Dacre (1321)||Thomas Fiennes, 8th Baron Dacre||1486||1534||
|-
|Baron FitzHugh (1321)||George FitzHugh, 7th Baron FitzHugh||1487||1513||
|-
|Baron Greystock (1321)||Elizabeth Dacre, 6th Baroness Greystoke||1487||1516||
|-
|Baron Harington (1326)||Cecily Bonville, 7th Baroness Harington||1460||1530||
|-
|rowspan="3"|Baron Scrope of Masham (1350)||Alice Scrope, 7th Baroness Scrope of Masham||1493||1502||Died
|-
|Elizabeth Scrope, 8th Baroness Scrope of Masham||1502||Aft. 1502||Died
|-
|Henry Scrope, 9th Baron Scrope of Masham||Aft. 1502||1512||
|-
|Baron Botreaux (1368)||Mary Hungerford, 5th Baroness Botreaux||1477||1529||
|-
|rowspan="2"|Baron Scrope of Bolton (1371)||Henry Scrope, 6th Baron Scrope of Bolton||1498||1506||Died
|-
|Henry Scrope, 7th Baron Scrope of Bolton||1506||1533||
|-
|rowspan="2"|Baron Lumley (1384)||George Lumley, 3rd Baron Lumley||1480||1508||Died
|-
|Richard Lumley, 4th Baron Lumley||1508||1510||
|-
|Baron Bergavenny (1392)||George Nevill, 5th Baron Bergavenny||1492||1536||
|-
|rowspan="2"|Baron Berkeley (1421)||Maurice Berkeley, 3rd Baron Berkeley||1492||1506||Died
|-
|Maurice Berkeley, 4th Baron Berkeley||1506||1523||
|-
|Baron Latimer (1432)||Richard Neville, 2nd Baron Latimer||1469||1530||
|-
|Baron Dudley (1440)||Edward Sutton, 2nd Baron Dudley||1487||1532||
|-
|rowspan="2"|Baron Lisle (1444)||John Grey, 4th Baron Lisle||1487||1504||Died
|-
|Elizabeth Grey, 5th Baroness Lisle||1504||1519||
|-
|rowspan="2"|Baron Saye and Sele (1447)||Richard Fiennes, 4th Baron Saye and Sele||1476||1501||Died
|-
|Edward Fiennes, 5th Baron Saye and Sele||1501||1528||
|-
|Baron Beauchamp of Powick (1447)||Richard Beauchamp, 2nd Baron Beauchamp||1475||1503||Died, title extinct
|-
|Baron Stourton (1448)||William Stourton, 5th Baron Stourton||1487||1523||
|-
|Baron Berners (1455)||John Bourchier, 2nd Baron Berners||1474||1533||
|-
|rowspan="2"|Baron Hastings de Hastings (1461)||Edward Hastings, 2nd Baron Hastings||1483||1506||Died
|-
|George Hastings, 3rd Baron Hastings||1506||1544||
|-
|Baron Herbert (1461)||Elizabeth Somerset, Baroness Herbert||1490||1514||
|-
|Baron Ogle (1461)||Ralph Ogle, 3rd Baron Ogle||1485||1513||
|-
|Baron Mountjoy (1465)||William Blount, 4th Baron Mountjoy||1485||1534||
|-
|Baron Dacre of Gilsland (1473)||Thomas Dacre, 2nd Baron Dacre||1485||1525||
|-
|rowspan="2"|Baron Grey of Powis (1482)||John Grey, 2nd Baron Grey of Powis||1497||1504||Died
|-
|Edward Grey, 3rd Baron Grey of Powis||1504||1552||
|-
|rowspan="2"|Baron Daubeney (1486)||Giles Daubeney, 1st Baron Daubeney||1486||1507||Died
|-
|Henry Daubeney, 2nd Baron Daubeney||1507||1548||
|-
|rowspan="2"|Baron Willoughby de Broke (1491)||Robert Willoughby, 1st Baron Willoughby de Broke||1492||1502||Died
|-
|Robert Willoughby, 2nd Baron Willoughby de Broke||1502||1521||
|-
|Baron Ormond of Rochford (1495)||Thomas Butler, 1st Baron Ormond of Rochford||1495||1515||
|-
|Baron Conyers (1509)||William Conyers, 1st Baron Conyers||1509||1524||New creation
|-
|Baron Darcy de Darcy (1509)||Thomas Darcy, 1st Baron Darcy de Darcy||1509||1538||New creation
|-
|}

Peerage of Scotland

|rowspan=2|Duke of Rothesay (1398)||James, Duke of Rothesay||1507||1508||Died
|-
|Arthur Stewart, Duke of Rothesay||1509||1510||
|-
|Duke of Ross (1488)||James Stewart, Duke of Ross||1488||1504||Died, title extinct
|-
|rowspan=2|Earl of Sutherland (1235)||John de Moravia, 8th Earl of Sutherland||1460||1508||Died
|-
|John de Moravia, 9th Earl of Sutherland||1508||1514||
|-
|Earl of Angus (1389)||Archibald Douglas, 5th Earl of Angus||1463||1513||
|-
|Earl of Crawford (1398)||John Lindsay, 6th Earl of Crawford||1495||1513||
|-
|Earl of Menteith (1427)||Alexander Graham, 2nd Earl of Menteith||1490||1537||
|-
|rowspan=2|Earl of Huntly (1445)||George Gordon, 2nd Earl of Huntly||1470||1501||Died
|-
|Alexander Gordon, 3rd Earl of Huntly||1501||1524||
|-
|rowspan=2|Earl of Erroll (1452)||William Hay, 3rd Earl of Erroll||1470||1507||Died
|-
|William Hay, 4th Earl of Erroll||1507||1513||
|-
|Earl of Caithness (1455)||William Sinclair, 2nd Earl of Caithness||1476||1513||
|-
|Earl of Argyll (1457)||Archibald Campbell, 2nd Earl of Argyll||1493||1513||
|-
|Earl of Atholl (1457)||John Stewart, 1st Earl of Atholl||1457||1512||
|-
|Earl of Morton (1458)||John Douglas, 2nd Earl of Morton||1493||1513||
|-
|Earl of Rothes (1458)||George Leslie, 2nd Earl of Rothes||1490||1513||
|-
|Earl Marischal (1458)||William Keith, 3rd Earl Marischal||1483||1530||
|-
|rowspan=2|Earl of Buchan (1469)||Alexander Stewart, 2nd Earl of Buchan||1469||1505||Died
|-
|John Stewart, 3rd Earl of Buchan||1505||1551||
|-
|Earl of Mar and Garioch (1486)||John Stewart, Earl of Mar and Garioch||1485||1503||Died, title extinct
|-
|Earl of Glencairn (1488)||Cuthbert Cunningham, 3rd Earl of Glencairn||1490||1541||
|-
|rowspan=2|Earl of Bothwell (1488)||Patrick Hepburn, 1st Earl of Bothwell||1488||1508||Died
|-
|Adam Hepburn, 2nd Earl of Bothwell||1508||1513||
|-
|Earl of Lennox (1488)||Matthew Stewart, 2nd Earl of Lennox||1495||1513||
|-
|Earl of Moray (1501)||James Stewart, 1st Earl of Moray||1501||1544||New creation
|-
|Earl of Arran (1503)||James Hamilton, 1st Earl of Arran||1503||1529||New creation
|-
|Earl of Montrose (1503)||William Graham, 1st Earl of Montrose||1503||1513||New creation
|-
|Earl of Eglinton (1507)||Hugh Montgomerie, 1st Earl of Eglinton||1507||1545||New creation
|-
|Earl of Cassilis (1509)||David Kennedy, 1st Earl of Cassilis||1509||1513||New creation
|-
|rowspan=2|Lord Erskine (1429)||Alexander Erskine, 3rd Lord Erskine||1494||1509||de jure Earl of Mar; died
|-
|Robert Erskine, 4th Lord Erskine||1509||1513||de jure Earl of Mar
|-
|Lord Somerville (1430)||John Somerville, 4th Lord Somerville||1491||1523||
|-
|rowspan=3|Lord Haliburton of Dirleton (1441)||James Haliburton, 5th Lord Haliburton of Dirleton||1492||1502||Died
|-
|Patrick Haliburton, 6th Lord Haliburton of Dirleton||1502||1506||
|-
|Janet Haliburton, 7th Lady Haliburton of Dirleton||1502||1560||
|-
|Lord Forbes (1442)||John Forbes, 6th Lord Forbes||1493||1547||
|-
|Lord Hamilton (1445)||James Hamilton, 2nd Lord Hamilton||1479||1529||Created Earl of Arran, see above
|-
|Lord Maxwell (1445)||John Maxwell, 3rd Lord Maxwell||1485||1513||
|-
|rowspan=3|Lord Glamis (1445)||John Lyon, 4th Lord Glamis||1497||1500||Died
|-
|George Lyon, 5th Lord Glamis||1500||1505||Died
|-
|John Lyon, 6th Lord Glamis||1505||1528||
|-
|Lord Graham (1445)||William Graham, 3rd Lord Graham||1472||1513||Created Earl of Montrose, see above
|-
|Lord Lindsay of the Byres (1445)||Patrick Lindsay, 4th Lord Lindsay||1497||1526||
|-
|rowspan=2|Lord Saltoun (1445)||James Abernethy, 3rd Lord Saltoun||1488||1505||Died
|-
|Alexander Abernethy, 4th Lord Saltoun||1505||1527||
|-
|Lord Gray (1445)||Andrew Gray, 2nd Lord Gray||1469||1514||
|-
|Lord Montgomerie (1449)||Hugh Montgomerie, 2nd Lord Montgomerie||1470||1545||Created Earl of Eglinton, see above
|-
|Lord Sinclair (1449)||Henry Sinclair, 3rd Lord Sinclair||1487||1513||
|-
|Lord Fleming (1451)||John Fleming, 2nd Lord Fleming||1494||1524||
|-
|rowspan=2|Lord Seton (1451)||George Seton, 2nd Lord Seton||1478||1508||Died
|-
|George Seton, 3rd Lord Seton||1508||1513||
|-
|Lord Borthwick (1452)||William Borthwick, 3rd Lord Borthwick||1484||1513||
|-
|rowspan=2|Lord Boyd (1454)||Alexander Boyd, 3rd Lord Boyd||1482||Aft. 1508||Died
|-
|Robert Boyd, 4th Lord Boyd||Aft. 1508||1558||
|-
|Lord Oliphant (1455)||John Oliphant, 2nd Lord Oliphant||1498||1516||
|-
|rowspan=2|Lord Kennedy (1457)||John Kennedy, 2nd Lord Kennedy||1489||1509||Died
|-
|David Kennedy, 3rd Lord Kennedy||1509||1513||Created Earl of Cassilis, see above
|-
|rowspan=2|Lord Livingston (1458)||James Livingston, 3rd Lord Livingston||1497||1503||Died
|-
|William Livingston, 4th Lord Livingston||1503||1518||
|-
|Lord Cathcart (1460)||John Cathcart, 2nd Lord Cathcart||1497||1535||
|-
|rowspan=2|Lord Lovat (1464)||Hugh Fraser, 1st Lord Lovat||1464||1500||Died
|-
|Thomas Fraser, 2nd Lord Lovat||1500||1524||
|-
|Lord Innermeath (1470)||Thomas Stewart, 2nd Lord Innermeath||1489||1513||
|-
|rowspan=2|Lord Carlyle of Torthorwald (1473)||John Carlyle, 1st Lord Carlyle||1473||1501||Died
|-
|William Carlyle, 2nd Lord Carlyle||1501||1524||
|-
|rowspan=2|Lord Home (1473)||Alexander Home, 2nd Lord Home||1490||1506||Died
|-
|Alexander Home, 3rd Lord Home||1506||1516||
|-
|Lord Ruthven (1488)||William Ruthven, 1st Lord Ruthven||1488||1528||
|-
|Lord Crichton of Sanquhar (1488)||Robert Crichton, 2nd Lord Crichton of Sanquhar||1494||1513||
|-
|Lord Drummond of Cargill (1488)||John Drummond, 1st Lord Drummond||1488||1519||
|-
|rowspan=2|Lord Hay of Yester (1488)||John Hay, 1st Lord Hay of Yester||1488||1508||Died
|-
|John Hay, 2nd Lord Hay of Yester||1508||1513||
|-
|Lord Sempill (1489)||John Sempill, 1st Lord Sempill||1489||1513||
|-
|rowspan=2|Lord Herries of Terregles (1490)||Herbert Herries, 1st Lord Herries of Terregles||1490||1505||Died
|-
|Andrew Herries, 2nd Lord Herries of Terregles||1505||1513||
|-
|rowspan=3|Lord Ogilvy of Airlie (1491)||James Ogilvy, 1st Lord Ogilvy of Airlie||1491||1504||Died
|-
|John Ogilvy, 2nd Lord Ogilvy of Airlie||1504||1506||Died
|-
|James Ogilvy, 3rd Lord Ogilvy of Airlie||1506||1524||
|-
|rowspan=2|Lord Ross (1499)||John Ross, 1st Lord Ross||1499||1501||Died
|-
|John Ross, 2nd Lord Ross||1501||1513||
|-
|Lord Avondale (1500)||Andrew Stewart, 1st Lord Avondale||1500||1513||New creation
|-
|Lord Elphinstone (1509)||Alexander Elphinstone, 1st Lord Elphinstone||1509||1513||New creation
|-
|}

Peerage of Ireland

|Earl of Kildare (1316)||Gerald FitzGerald, 8th Earl of Kildare||1478||1513||
|-
|Earl of Ormond (1328)||Thomas Butler, 7th Earl of Ormond||1478||1515||
|-
|Earl of Desmond (1329)||Maurice FitzGerald, 9th Earl of Desmond||1487||1520||
|-
|Earl of Waterford (1446)||George Talbot, 4th Earl of Waterford||1473||1538||
|-
|rowspan=2|Viscount Gormanston (1478)||Robert Preston, 1st Viscount Gormanston||1478||1503||Died
|-
|William Preston, 2nd Viscount Gormanston||1503||1532||
|-
|rowspan=2|Baron Athenry (1172)||Thomas III de Bermingham||1473||1500||Died
|-
|Meiler de Bermingham||1500||1529||
|-
|rowspan=2|Baron Kingsale (1223)||Edmond de Courcy, 14th Baron Kingsale||1499||1505||Died
|-
|David de Courcy, 15th Baron Kingsale||1505||1520||
|-
|Baron Kerry (1223)||Edmond Fitzmaurice, 10th Baron Kerry||1498||1543||
|-
|rowspan=2|Baron Barry (1261)||William Barry, 11th Baron Barry||1488||1500||Died
|-
|John Barry, 12th Baron Barry||1500||1530||
|-
|Baron Slane (1370)||Christopher Fleming, 8th Baron Slane||1492||1517||
|-
|Baron Howth (1425)||Nicholas St Lawrence, 4th Baron Howth||1485||1526||
|-
|Baron Killeen (1449)||Edmond Plunkett, 4th Baron Killeen||1469||1510||
|-
|Baron Trimlestown (1461)||Christopher Barnewall, 2nd Baron Trimlestown||1470||1513||
|-
|rowspan=2|Baron Dunsany (1462)||John Plunkett, 3rd Baron of Dunsany||1480||1500||Died
|-
|Edward Plunkett, 4th Baron of Dunsany||1500||1521||
|-
|Baron Delvin (1486)||Richard Nugent, 1st Baron Delvin||1486||1537||
|-
|}

References

 

Lists of peers by decade
1500s in England
1500s in Ireland
16th century in England
16th century in Scotland
16th century in Ireland
16th-century English nobility
16th-century Scottish peers
16th-century Irish people
Peers